Peralta Rocks is a group of about 8 small rocks covering an area 4 nautical miles (7 km) by 2 nautical miles (3.7 km), lying 7 nautical miles (13 km) north of Cape Ducorps, Trinity Peninsula. Named by the Chilean Antarctic Expedition, 1949–50, for Lieutenant Roberto Peralta Bell, second-in-command of the oil tanker Lientur.

References

External links

Rock formations of the Trinity Peninsula